The 1978 Wendy's Tennis Classic, also known as the Buckeye Championships, was a men's tennis tournament played on outdoor clay courts at the Muirfield Village in Dublin, a suburb of Columbus, Ohio in the United States that was part of the 1978 Grand Prix circuit. It was the ninth edition of the tournament and was held  from August 7 through August 13, 1978. Third-seeded Arthur Ashe won the singles title and earned $12,750 first-prize money.

Finals

Singles
 Arthur Ashe defeated  Bob Lutz 6–3, 6–4
 It was Ashe's 2nd singles title of the year and 75th of his career.

Doubles
 Colin Dibley /  Bob Giltinan defeated  Marcello Lara /  Eliot Teltscher 6–2, 6–3

References

External links
 ITF tournament edition details

Buckeye Tennis Championships
Buckeye Tennis Championships
Buckeye Tennis Championships
Buckeye Tennis Championships